Peever Flats is an unincorporated community and census-designated place (CDP) in Roberts County, South Dakota, United States, within the Lake Traverse Indian Reservation. It was first listed as a CDP prior to the 2020 census. The population of the CDP was 129 at the 2020 census.

Demographics

References 

Census-designated places in Roberts County, South Dakota
Census-designated places in South Dakota